Ali I may refer to: 

 Ali ibn Idris (died 848), Idrisid sultan of the Western Maghreb
Baba Ali Chaouch (died 1718), Dey-Pacha, or sultan of Algiers.
 Ali of Hejaz (1879–1935), king of Hejaz from 1924 to 1925
 Ali Vâsib (1903–1983), titular Sultan of Turkey and Ottoman Caliph from 1977 to 1983 under the name 'Ali I